Softly, Softly: Task Force is a police procedural series which ran on BBC 1 from 1969 to 1976. It was a revamp of Softly, Softly, itself a spin-off from Z-Cars.  The change was made partly to coincide with the coming of colour broadcasting to the BBC's main channel BBC1.  The programme was due to be called simply Task Force, but reluctant to sacrifice a much-loved brand the BBC compromised this so it became Softly, Softly: Task Force.

Outline
At the end of Softly Softly, the main characters – Detective Chief Superintendent Barlow (Stratford Johns) and Detective Inspector Watt (Frank Windsor) – both applied for the role of head of CID at the newly formed police force, the fictional Thamesford Constabulary, which was said to be a product of amalgamations carried out during a recent reorganisation of the British police and is referred to as the third largest force in Britain.

Barlow is appointed to the role, which though more prestigious because of the size of Thamesford Constabulary, carries the same rank (chief superintendent) as his current role as deputy co-ordinator of the Southwest Regional Crime Squad. There is also a vacancy for a deputy head of CID and Watt as runner up is appointed gaining the rank of detective superintendent. Upon arrival in Thamesford, Barlow recommends the formation of two task forces. These are set up and Watt is made commander of Number One Task Force in addition to his duties as deputy head of CID. Harry Hawkins (Norman Bowler), seen as a detective sergeant in the South West Regional Crime Squad in Softly Softly, has become a uniformed inspector at Thamesford and is quickly made a detective inspector in Number One Task Force.

Although there is said to be a Number Two Task Force, the series centres on the activities of Number One Task Force usually referred to simply as "the task force". The task force contains a mixture of CID and uniform personnel and is meant to provide a resource for use in big operations. Though at times the task force has roles such as policing a football match, providing security for a visiting senator and responding to a terrorist incident at an airport, they are mostly shown assisting Barlow and Watt to solve murders and other crimes. This CID bias makes most episodes quite reminiscent of those in the previous series.
 
The stories were set in the fictional south-eastern English borough of Kingley (played by Rochester and the Medway area of Kent), where the team were under the baleful eye of Chief Constable Cullen (Walter Gotell).

The continuing storyline of the series saw Barlow widowed in 1972, after which he was headhunted by the Home Office to work on special cases (this became the series Barlow at Large). This left the way clear for Watt to come out of Barlow's shadow and take command in his own right, with the reliable assistance of Hawkins. Regulars included Terence Rigby as dog handler PC Snow with his dogs Inky and Radar, David Lloyd Meredith (Sgt Evans) and Walter Gotell (Chief Con. Cullen).

Series run down

Cast

Others

* PC Knowles is never given a first name on-screen.

Archive status
All bar one episode of Task Force survive in the BBC archives in their original format (either 2" Quad VT or 16mm colour film, depending on the episode). The one exception is 1972's "Welcome to the Club" which only survives as a black and white copy of the originally colour episode. This one black and white episode survives on 16mm film.

DVD release
Series 1 received a Region 2 DVD release from Simply Media.  This was released on 18 November 2013.

Simply Media released Series 2 on Region 2 DVD in September 2016.

Series development
Barlow and Watt appeared again in a six-part series in 1973, which saw the characters re-appraising the Jack the Ripper murders.  The pair would state all the known facts and with the aid of specially staged reconstructions, attempt to work out how the crimes were committed, though usually nothing new was conclusively proven.

They were spun off into one further outing, Second Verdict.  Over six weeks, they re-investigated some of the most baffling historic criminal cases, including the Lindbergh kidnapping and the murders of the Princes in the Tower by King Richard III.  The characters sparred off each other to get to the truth made for entertaining television, but with the exception of the final episode, it was hampered by a lack of actual evidence to offer real 'second verdicts'.  A comparable ITV series Killers featuring detailed reconstructions of notorious crime trials used much dialogue based on actual transcripts, which at the time didn't help Second Verdict.  In a contemporary interview, Stratford Johns remarked that: "I did not like the title. It was too limiting. I would have preferred 'Second Opinion'".

The character of John Watt would see one final solo appearance in the last ever Z-Cars, in September 1978.

References

External links
 

1960s British police procedural television series

1960s British crime television series
1970s British police procedural television series

1970s British crime television series

1969 British television series debuts

1976 British television series endings
British crime television series

British crime drama television series

English-language television shows

British television spin-offs